Savannah Steyn (born 1996) is an English actress. She starred in the Sky One series Intergalactic (2021).

Early life
Steyn was born in the South London Borough of Wandsworth. She is of South African descent. She attended the BRIT School before going on to graduate from the Guildhall School of Music and Drama.

Career
Steyn made her television debut as Kaylah in the third series of the Sky Atlantic and Canal+ crime drama The Tunnel. She then played Chantal in the BBC Three short-form sitcom Wannabe. She also made a guest appearance in the Sky One series A Discovery of Witches and starred in the short Ladies Day for Shortflix.

Steyn played Lisa in the 2019 horror film Crawl. In 2021, Steyn starred as Ash Harper in the science fiction series Intergalactic, also on Sky One. The following year, she played young Laena Velaryon in an episode of the HBO fantasy series House of the Dragon, a Game of Thrones prequel. In October 2022, it was rumoured Steyn would play young Ahsoka Tano (played by Rosario Dawson as an adult) in a forthcoming Disney+ spinoff of The Mandalorian titled Ahsoka.

Filmography

Stage
 Hatch (2016), Talawa Theatre Company, Hackney Showroom

Audio
 "Marina Hyde, FKA twigs, and extortionate hand soaps" (2022), Weekend Podcast

References

External links
 

Living people
1996 births
Actresses from London
Alumni of the Guildhall School of Music and Drama
Black British actresses
English people of South African descent
People from the London Borough of Wandsworth